Shanelle is a female given name. Notable people with the name include:

 Shanelle Arjoon (born 1997), Trinidadian footballer
 Shanelle Jackson (born 1980), American politician
 Shanelle Nyasiase (born 1997), Ethiopian-born South Sudanese fashion model.
 Shanelle Porter (born 1972), American sprinter who specialized in the 400 metres
 Shanelle Workman (born 1978), American actress, voice actress, producer and director

See also
 Shanell (born 1980), American musician
 Chanelle, given name
 Shonelle Jackson, American murderer

Given names
Feminine given names
English-language feminine given names